Leave the City may refer to:

 "Leave the City", a 2005 song by Magnolia Electric Co. from Trials & Errors
 "Leave the City", a 2018 song by Twenty One Pilots from Trench